Ellingsøy Church is a parish church of the Church of Norway in Ålesund Municipality in Møre og Romsdal county, Norway. It is located on the island of Ellingsøya, just west of the village of Myklebost. It is the church for the Ellingsøy parish which is part of the Nordre Sunnmøre prosti (deanery) in the Diocese of Møre. The brick church was built in a fan-shaped design in 1990 using plans drawn up by the architect Lauritz Nes. The church seats about 380 people.

History
The brick church was built in 1990 by the architect Lauritz Nes and it originally was a chapel for the parish. In 1998, the chapel was expanded by the architect Oskar Norderval and it was consecrated as a church on 30 August 1998.

See also
List of churches in Møre

References

Buildings and structures in Ålesund
Churches in Møre og Romsdal
Brick churches in Norway
Fan-shaped churches in Norway
20th-century Church of Norway church buildings
Churches completed in 1990
1990 establishments in Norway